defaults is a command line utility that manipulates plist files. Introduced in 1998 OPENSTEP, defaults is found in the system's descendants macOS and GNUstep.

The name "defaults" derives from OpenStep's name for user preferences, Defaults, or NSUserDefaults in Foundation Kit. In macOS, the  part of the path is replaced by the more intuitive . defaults accesses the plists based on the domain given.

defaults is also able to read and write any plist specified with a path, although Apple plans to phase out this utility in a future version.

Usage
Common uses of defaults:

 $ defaults read DOMAIN # gets all
 $ defaults read DOMAIN PROPERTY_NAME # gets
 $ defaults write DOMAIN PROPERTY_NAME VALUE # sets
 $ defaults delete DOMAIN PROPERTY_NAME # resets a property
 $ defaults delete DOMAIN # resets preferences

DOMAIN should be replaced by the plist file name sans extension ('.plist'). plist files are named with reverse domain name notation. For example:

 $ defaults read com.apple.iTunes # prints all iTunes preference values

plist files store keys and values. The PROPERTY_NAME key is the name of the property to modify. For example, to remove the search field from Safari's address bar:

 $ defaults write com.apple.Safari AddressBarIncludesGoogle 0
 $ # or
 $ defaults write com.apple.Safari AddressBarIncludesGoogle -bool NO # case-sensitive!

Using "1", "YES", or "TRUE" instead restores this to the default of including search.

Preferences can at times corrupt applications. To reset Address Book's preferences, either the file ~/Library/Preferences/com.apple.AddressBook.plist must be removed or the following command issued:

 $ defaults delete com.apple.AddressBook

Compound values 
defaults prints values in the OpenStep format. It allows the VALUE to be arrays and dicts, as long as they conform to old-style plist syntax.

Settings
Some example settings configurable with defaults under macOS:

SS64 documents a set of other keys that can be changed for each software (not the global domain) in macOS. Other sites also document settings to be changed using defaults. Apple does not publish a complete list of these "secret knobs", but their support site does occasionally provide defaults commands for user to change a certain setting, such as the creation of .DS_Store.

GNUstep documents its defaults more clearly, so that there is no such thing as a "hidden settings" community like there is for macOS.

References

NSUserDefaults documentation Apple Inc

MacOS software
GNUstep
Command-line software